CCGA may refer to:

 Cornwall Commonwealth Games Association
 Canadian Coast Guard Auxiliary
 Chicago Council on Global Affairs
 College of Coastal Georgia